"Sex Metal Barbie" is a song by American rock band In This Moment. It is the third single taken from the band's fifth album Black Widow.

About the song
It was first premiered live at the band's Knotfest appearance on October 25, 2014. The single was released to online retailers as the fourth instant preorder download track on November 4, 2014. A pink limited edition 7" vinyl single was released for Record Store Day in 2015 on April 18, 2015. The single features the album version of the song and a remix.

The song is about the negative feedback the band has encountered online, especially towards lead vocalist Maria Brink. Brink's approach on building the song was to go online and search for awful comments and rumors that target her and turn them into lyrics.

It was revealed in March 2015 that the music video would be directed by Brink herself and shot in March after their European tour run.

Track listing

Personnel
Maria Brink – lead vocals, piano
Chris Howorth – lead guitar, backing vocals
Randy Weitzel – rhythm guitar
Travis Johnson – bass guitar
Tom Hane – drums, percussions

Certifications

References

2014 singles
2014 songs
Atlantic Records singles
In This Moment songs
Songs with feminist themes
Songs written by Kevin Churko